Bordighera Press is an independent publisher that was founded in 1989 by Fred Gardaphé, Paolo Giordano, and Anthony Julian Tamburri. Committed to Italian and Italian American culture in North America, the press consists of four series (Bordighera Poetry Prize, Crossings, Saggistica, and Via Folios) and two journals (VIA and Italiana).

Based in Indiana, the publisher also has editorial offices located in New York City.

History
Born out of an anthology, "From the Margins, Writings in Italian Americana," and the desire to go beyond stereotypical portrayals, the founders of Bordighera Press wanted to see the full array of the Italian American experience reflected both in popular and scholarly works. Since its inception, the press has established itself as a platform for the voices of Italians and people of Italian descent in North America.

Bordighera Poetry Prize
Between 1998 and 2013, the press awarded the best poetry manuscript in English by an American poet of Italian descent the Bordighera Poetry Prize, hoping to inspire and keep alive the tradition of the Italian language amongst emerging Italian American authors, immigrants, and their descendants.

Authors

References

1989 establishments in the United States
American publishing families